The  Itabaca Channel separates the islands of Baltra and Santa Cruz in the Galápagos archipielago in Ecuador. The Itabaca Channel is crossed by water taxis who ferry passengers from Baltra (South Seymour) in the North to Santa Cruz in the South. The channel is around 400 meters its narrowest point.

Additional images

Galápagos Islands
Landforms of Galápagos Province
Bodies of water of Ecuador